WTOU (1660 AM) is a commercial radio station licensed by the Federal Communications Commission (FCC) to operate on 1660 kHz from facilities located in Kalamazoo, Michigan.

History
WTOU began as the "expanded band" twin to a station operating on the standard AM band. On March 17, 1997, the FCC announced that eighty-eight stations had been given permission to move to newly available "Expanded Band" transmitting frequencies, ranging from 1610 to 1700 kHz, with then-WQSN in Kalamazoo authorized to move from 1470 to 1660 kHz.

A construction permit for the expanded band station was assigned the WQSN call letters on October 1, 1998, concurrent with the call letters of the original WQSN on 1470 AM changing to WKLZ. The FCC's initial policy was that both the original station and its expanded band counterpart could operate simultaneously for up to five years, after which owners would have to turn in one of the two licenses, depending on whether they preferred the new assignment or elected to remain on the original frequency, although this deadline was extended multiple times. It was ultimately decided to transfer full operations to the expanded band station, and on February 20, 2006, the original station on 1470 AM, now WKLZ, was deleted.

The station had been licensed to Fairfield Broadcasting as WQSN. It was sold to Midwest Communications in 2006. The FCC approved a callsign change on March 26, 2007 to WQLR, the former callsign of WVFM, an existing FM music station owned by Midwest Communications in Kalamazoo.

The station flipped from sports to urban adult contemporary on December 1, 2020. On December 18, 2020, the station switched callsigns with WTOU.

References

Michiguide.com - WQLR History

External links

FCC History Cards for DWKLZ (1470 AM) (covering 1955-1981 as WKLZ / WYYY)

TOU (AM)
Urban adult contemporary radio stations in the United States
Radio stations established in 2001
2001 establishments in Michigan
Midwest Communications radio stations